Raisina Hill (IAST: Rāysīnā Pahāṛī), often used as a metonym for the seat of the Government of India, is an area of New Delhi, housing India's most important government buildings, including Rashtrapati Bhavan, the official residence of  The President of India on citadel at Raisina Hill and the Secretariat building housing the Prime Minister's Office and several other important ministries. The hill is seen as an Indian acropolis with Rashtrapati Bhavan as the Parthenon. 

Under the Central Vista project, the Prime Minister’s residence will be shifted behind the existing South Block, while the V-P’s residence is proposed to be relocated behind North Block. The Vice President's enclave will be on a site of 15 acres, with 32 five-storey buildings at a maximum height of 15 meters. The Prime Minister's new office and residence will be on a site of 15 acres, with 10 four-storey buildings at a maximum height of 12 meters with a building for keeping Special Protection Group. The project also includes converting North and South Blocks into public museums, creating an ensemble of new secretariat buildings to house all ministries.

The Raisina Hill is open to the public and offers individual and group guided tours. The Raisina Hill buildings continue to attract thousands of visitors from across the world for the sense of grandeur they project.

History of Raisina Hill 
During the colonial era, leading British architects Edwin Lutyens and Herbert Baker envisaged the Central Vista complex as the centre of administration in India to house all facilities needed for efficient functioning of the Government. It was inaugurated in 1931 and consisted of the buildings Rashtrapati Bhawan, Parliament House, North and South Blocks and the Record Office (later named as The National Archives), along with the India Gate monument and the civic gardens on either side of the Rajpath. The plan was designed using traditional urban planning instruments, featuring a strong axis, an emphasised focal point, formation of important nodes, and a definitive termination point. At the time, it was one of the largest projects of its kind in the world, conceived and designed to reflect the spirit, progress and global importance of India.Indian influences marked the overall design of the Raisina Hill(Central Vista). It used red and beige sandstone, which had been used for the monumental architecture of Delhi since the 13th century; the modelling of the dome of Viceroy’s House on the Great Stupa at Sanchi; ancient Indian bell capitals for the Pillars of Dominion placed between the Secretariat Blocks; and countless features of Indian architecture – jalis (pierced stone screens), chhajas (projecting overhangs), chhatris (pillared cupolas), and more.

Land Acquisition 
The term "Raisina Hill" was coined following acquisition of land from 300 families from local villages was acquired under the "1894 Land Acquisition Act" to begin the construction of the Viceroy's House.

Gallery

Delhi Metro 
The nearest Delhi Metro stations to the Raisina Hill are: Central Secretariat metro station, Lok Kalyan Marg metro station, Udyog Bhawan Metro station, Janpath Metro station, Rajiv Chowk Metro station, Patel Chowk Metro station.

See also 
Kartavya Path
Lutyens' Delhi
Raisina Dialogue

References

Neighbourhoods in Delhi
New Delhi
Government buildings in India